The hyphen  is a punctuation mark used to join words and to separate syllables of a single word. The use of hyphens is called hyphenation. Son-in-law is an example of a hyphenated word.

The hyphen is sometimes confused with dashes (en dash  and em dash  and others), which are longer, or with the minus sign , which is also longer and usually higher up to match the crossbar in the plus sign .

As an orthographic concept, the hyphen is a single entity. In character encoding it is represented by any of several characters and glyphs, including the Unicode hyphen (shown at the top of the infobox on this page), the hyphen-minus, the soft hyphen, and the non-breaking hyphen. The character most often used to represent a hyphen (and the one produced by the key on a keyboard) is called the "hyphen-minus" by Unicode, deriving from the original ASCII standard, where it was called "hyphen(minus)".

Etymology 
An  was an undertie-like  sign written below two adjacent letters to indicate that they belong to the same word when it was necessary to avoid ambiguity, before word spacing was practiced.

Use in English 

The English language does not have definitive hyphenation rules, though various style guides provide detailed usage recommendations and have a significant amount of overlap in what they advise. Hyphens are mostly used to break single words into parts or to join ordinarily separate words into single words. Spaces are not placed between a hyphen and either of the elements it connects except when using a suspended or "hanging" hyphen that stands in for a repeated word (e.g., nineteenth- and  writers). Style conventions that apply to hyphens (and dashes) have evolved to support ease of reading in complex constructions; editors often accept deviations if they aid rather than hinder easy comprehension.

The use of the hyphen in English compound nouns and verbs has, in general, been steadily declining. Compounds that might once have been hyphenated are increasingly left with spaces or are combined into one word. Reflecting this changing usage, in 2007, the sixth edition of the Shorter Oxford English Dictionary removed the hyphens from 16,000 entries, such as fig-leaf (now fig leaf), pot-belly (now pot belly), and pigeon-hole (now pigeonhole). The increasing prevalence of computer technology and the advent of the Internet have given rise to a subset of common nouns that might have been hyphenated in the past (e.g., toolbar, hyperlink, and pastebin).

Despite decreased use, hyphenation remains the norm in certain compound-modifier constructions and, among some authors, with certain prefixes (see below). Hyphenation is also routinely used as part of syllabification in justified texts to avoid unsightly spacing (especially in columns with narrow line lengths, as when used with newspapers).

Separating

Justification and line-wrapping 
When flowing text, it is sometimes preferable to break a word into two so that it continues on another line rather than moving the entire word to the next line. The word may be divided at the nearest break point between syllables (syllabification) and a hyphen inserted to indicate that the letters form a word fragment, rather than a full word. This allows more efficient use of paper, allows flush appearance of right-side margins (justification) without oddly large word spaces, and decreases the problem of rivers. This kind of hyphenation is most useful when the width of the column (called the "line length" in typography) is very narrow. For example:

Rules (or guidelines) for correct hyphenation vary between languages, and may be complex, and they can interact with other orthographic and typesetting practices. Hyphenation algorithms, when employed in concert with dictionaries, are sufficient for all but the most formal texts.

It may be necessary to distinguish an incidental line-break hyphen from one integral to a word being mentioned (as when used in a dictionary) or present in an original text being quoted (when in a critical edition), not only to control its word wrap behavior (which encoding handles with hard and soft hyphens having the same glyph) but also to differentiate appearance (with a different glyph). Webster's Third New International Dictionary and the Chambers Dictionary use a double hyphen for integral hyphens and a single hyphen for line-breaks, whereas Kromhout's Afrikaans–English dictionary uses the opposite convention. The Concise Oxford Dictionary (fifth edition) suggested repeating an integral hyphen at the start of the following line.

Prefixes and suffixes 
However, the unhyphenated style, which is also called closed up or solid, is usually preferred, particularly when the derivative has been relatively familiarized or popularized through extensive use in various contexts. As a rule of thumb, affixes are not hyphenated unless the lack of a hyphen would hurt clarity.

The hyphen may be used between vowel letters (e.g., ee, ea, ei) to indicate that they do not form a digraph. Some words have both hyphenated and unhyphenated variants: /deescalate, /cooperation, /reexamine, /deemphasize, and so on. When there are tripled letters, the hyphenated variant of these words is often more common (as in  instead of shelllike).

Although  is still hyphenated by both Dorland's and Merriam-Webster's Medical, the solid (that is, unhyphenated) styling (protooncogene) is a common variant, particularly among oncologists and geneticists.

A diaeresis may also be used in a like fashion, either to separate and mark off monographs (as in coöperation) or to signalize a vocalic terminal e (for example, Brontë). This use of the diaeresis peaked in the late 19th and early 20th centuries, but it was never applied extensively across the language: only a handful of diaereses, including coöperation and Brontë, are encountered with any appreciable frequency in English; thus reëxamine, reïterate, deëmphasize, etc. are seldom encountered. In borrowings from Modern French, whose orthography utilizes the diaeresis as a means to differentiate graphemes, various English dictionaries list the dieresis as optional (as in naive and naïve) despite the juxtaposition of a and i.

Syllabification and spelling 
Hyphens are occasionally used to denote syllabification, as in syl-la-bi-fi-ca-tion. Various British and North American dictionaries use an interpunct, sometimes called a "middle dot" or "hyphenation point", for this purpose, as in syl·la·bi·fi·ca·tion. This allows the hyphen to be reserved only for places where a hard hyphen is intended (for example). Similarly, hyphens may be used to indicate how a word is being or should be spelled. For example, W-O-R-D spells "word".

In nineteenth-century American literature, hyphens were also used irregularly to divide syllables in words from indigenous North American languages, without regard for etymology or pronunciation, such as "Shuh-shuh-gah" (from Ojibwe zhashagi, "blue heron") in The Song of Hiawatha. This usage is now rare and proscribed, except in some place names such as Ah-gwah-ching.

Joining

Compound modifiers 

Compound modifiers are groups of two or more words that jointly modify the meaning of another word. When a compound modifier other than an adverb–adjective combination appears before a term, the compound modifier is often hyphenated to prevent misunderstanding, such as in  player or  paintings. Without the hyphen, there is potential confusion about whether the writer means a "player of American football" or an "American player of football" and whether the writer means paintings that are "little celebrated" or "celebrated paintings" that are little. Compound modifiers can extend to three or more words, as in  candy, and can be adverbial as well as adjectival ( frightening). However, if the compound is a familiar one, it is usually unhyphenated. For example, some style guides prefer the construction high school students, to  students. Although the expression is technically ambiguous ("students of a high school"/"school students who are high"), it would normally be formulated differently if other than the first meaning were intended. Noun–noun compound modifiers may also be written without a hyphen when no confusion is likely: grade point average and department store manager.

When a compound modifier follows the term to which it applies, a hyphen is typically not used if the compound is a temporary compound. For example, "that gentleman is well respected", not "that gentleman is well-respected"; or "a patient-centered approach was used" but "the approach was patient centered." But permanent compounds, found as headwords in dictionaries, are treated as invariable, so if they are hyphenated in the cited dictionary, the hyphenation will be used in both attributive and predicative positions. For example, "A cost-effective method was used" and "The method was cost-effective" (cost-effective is a permanent compound that is hyphenated as a headword in various dictionaries). When one of the parts of the modifier is a proper noun or a proper adjective, there is no hyphen (e.g., "a South American actor").

When the first modifier in a compound is an adverb ending in -ly (e.g., "a poorly written novel"), various style guides advise no hyphen. However, some do allow for this use. For example, The Economist Style Guide advises: "Adverbs do not need to be linked to participles or adjectives by hyphens in simple constructions... Less common adverbs, including all those that end -ly, are less likely to need hyphens." In the 19th century, it was common to hyphenate adverb–adjective modifiers with the adverb ending in -ly (e.g., "a craftily-constructed chair"). However, this has become rare. For example, wholly owned subsidiary and quickly moving vehicle are unambiguous, because the adverbs clearly modify the adjectives: "quickly" cannot modify "vehicle".

However, if an adverb can also function as an adjective, then a hyphen may be or should be used for clarity, depending on the style guide. For example, the phrase  reasons ("reasons that are more important") is distinguished from more important reasons ("additional important reasons"), where more is an adjective. Similarly,  scenery (with a mass-noun) is distinct from more beautiful scenery. (In contrast, the hyphen in "a  reason" is not necessary, because the syntax cannot be misinterpreted.) A few short and common words—such as well, ill, little, and much—attract special attention in this category. The hyphen in "well-[past_participled] noun", such as in "well-differentiated cells", might reasonably be judged superfluous (the syntax is unlikely to be misinterpreted), yet plenty of style guides call for it. Because early has both adverbial and adjectival senses, its hyphenation can attract attention; some editors, due to comparison with advanced-stage disease and adult-onset disease, like the parallelism of early-stage disease and early-onset disease. Similarly, the hyphen in little-celebrated paintings clarifies that one is not speaking of little paintings.

Hyphens are usually used to connect numbers and words in modifying phrases. Such is the case when used to describe dimensional measurements of weight, size, and time, under the rationale that, like other compound modifiers, they take hyphens in attributive position (before the modified noun), although not in predicative position (after the modified noun). This is applied whether numerals or words are used for the numbers. Thus  woman and  woman or  wingspan and  wingspan, but the woman is 28 years old and a wingspan of 32 feet. However, with symbols for SI units (such as m or kg)—in contrast to the names of these units (such as metre or kilogram)—the numerical value is always separated from it with a space: a 25 kg sphere. When the unit names are spelled out, this recommendation does not apply: a  sphere, a roll of  film.

In spelled-out fractions, hyphens are usually used when the fraction is used as an adjective but not when it is used as a noun: thus  majority and  portion but I drank two thirds of the bottle or I kept three quarters of it for myself. However, at least one major style guide hyphenates spelled-out fractions invariably (whether adjective or noun).

In English,  an en dash, sometimes replaces the hyphen in hyphenated compounds if either of its constituent parts is already hyphenated or contains a space (for example, San Francisco–area residents, hormone receptor–positive cells, cell cycle–related factors, and public-school–private-school rivalries). A commonly used alternative style is the hyphenated string (hormone-receptor-positive cells, cell-cycle-related factors). (For other aspects of en dash–versus–hyphen use, see Dash § En dash.)

Object–verbal-noun compounds 

When an object is compounded with a verbal noun, such as egg-beater (a tool that beats eggs), the result is sometimes hyphenated. Some authors do this consistently, others only for disambiguation; in this case, egg-beater, egg beater, and eggbeater are all common.

An example of an ambiguous phrase appears in they stood near a group of alien lovers, which without a hyphen implies that they stood near a group of lovers who were aliens; they stood near a group of alien-lovers clarifies that they stood near a group of people who loved aliens, as "alien" can be either an adjective or a noun. On the other hand, in the phrase a hungry pizza-lover, the hyphen will often be omitted (a hungry pizza lover), as "pizza" cannot be an adjective and the phrase is therefore unambiguous.

Similarly, a man-eating shark is nearly the opposite of a man eating shark; the first refers to a shark that eats people, and the second to a man who eats shark meat. A government-monitoring program is a program that monitors the government, whereas a government monitoring program is a government program that monitors something else.

Personal names 

Some married couples compose a new surname (sometimes referred to as a double-barrelled name) for their new family by combining their two surnames with a hyphen. Jane Doe and John Smith might become Jane and John Smith-Doe, or Doe-Smith, for instance. In some countries only the woman hyphenates her birth surname, appending her husband's surname.

With already-hyphenated names, some parts are typically dropped. For example, Aaron Johnson and Samantha Taylor-Wood became Aaron Taylor-Johnson and Sam Taylor-Johnson. Not all hyphenated surnames are the result of marriage. For example Julia Louis-Dreyfus is a descendant of Louis Lemlé Dreyfus whose son was Léopold Louis-Dreyfus.

Other compounds 
Connecting hyphens are used in a large number of miscellaneous compounds, other than modifiers, such as in lily-of-the-valley, cock-a-hoop, clever-clever, tittle-tattle and orang-utan. Use is often dictated by convention rather than fixed rules, and hyphenation styles may vary between authors; for example, orang-utan is also written as orangutan or orang utan, and lily-of-the-valley may be hyphenated or not.

Suspended hyphens 

A suspended hyphen (also called a suspensive hyphen or hanging hyphen, or less commonly a dangling or floating hyphen) may be used when a single base word is used with separate, consecutive, hyphenated words that are connected by "and", "or", or "to". For example, short-term and long-term plans may be written as short- and long-term plans. This usage is now common and specifically recommended in some style guides. Suspended hyphens are also used, though less commonly, when the base word comes first, such as in "investor-owned and ". Uses such as "applied and sociolinguistics" (instead of "applied linguistics and sociolinguistics") are frowned upon; the Indiana University style guide uses this example and says "Do not 'take a shortcut' when the first expression is ordinarily open" (i.e., ordinarily two separate words). This is different, however, from instances where prefixes that are normally closed up (styled solidly) are used suspensively. For example,  becomes  (not ) when suspended. Some editors prefer to avoid suspending such pairs, choosing instead to write out both words in full.

Other uses 

A hyphen may be used to connect groups of numbers, such as in dates (see below), telephone numbers or sports scores. It can also be used to indicate a range of values, although many styles prefer an en dash (see examples at ).

The hyphen is sometimes used to hide letters in words (filleting for redaction or censoring), as in G-d, although an en dash can be used as well ("G–d").

The hyphen is often used in reduplicatives.

Varied meanings 
Some stark examples of semantic changes caused by the placement of hyphens to mark attributive phrases:
 Disease-causing poor nutrition is poor nutrition that causes disease.
 Disease causing poor nutrition is a disease that causes poor nutrition.
 A hard-working man is a man who works hard.
 A hard working man is a working man who is tough.
 A man-eating shark is a shark that eats humans.
 A man eating shark is a man who is eating shark meat.
 Three-hundred-year-old trees are an indeterminate number of trees that are each 300 years old.
 Three hundred-year-old trees are three trees that are each 100 years old.
 Three hundred year-old trees are 300 trees that are each a year old.

Origin and history 

The first known documentation of the hyphen is in the grammatical works of Dionysius Thrax. At the time hyphenation was joining two words that would otherwise be read separately by a low tie mark between the two words. In Greek these marks were known as enotikon, officially romanized as a hyphen.

With the introduction of letter-spacing in the Middle Ages, the hyphen, still written beneath the text, reversed its meaning. Scribes used the mark to connect two words that had been incorrectly separated by a space. This era also saw the introduction of the marginal hyphen, for words broken across lines.

The modern format of the hyphen originated with Johannes Gutenberg of Mainz, Germany,  with the publication of his 42-line Bible. His tools did not allow for a sublinear hyphen, and he thus moved it to the middle of the line. Examination of an original copy on vellum (Hubay index #35) in the U. S. Library of Congress shows that Gutenberg's movable type was set justified in a uniform style, 42 equal lines per page. The Gutenberg printing press required words made up of individual letters of type to be held in place by a surrounding non-printing rigid frame. Gutenberg solved the problem of making each line the same length to fit the frame by inserting a hyphen as the last element at the right-side margin. This interrupted the letters in the last word, requiring the remaining letters be carried over to the start of the line below. His double hyphen appears throughout the Bible as a short, double line inclined to the right at a 60-degree angle:

Use in computing

Hyphen-minuses 

In the ASCII character encoding, the hyphen (or minus) is character 4510. The unambiguous hyphen at U+2010 is generally inconvenient to enter on most keyboards and the glyphs for this hyphen and the hyphen-minus are identical in most fonts (Lucida Sans Unicode is one of the few exceptions). Consequently, use of the hyphen-minus as the hyphen character is very common. Even the Unicode Standard regularly uses the hyphen-minus rather than this hyphen.

Nevertheless, in many spreadsheet and programming applications the hyphen-minus must be typed to indicate subtraction, as use of the Unicode minus sign will produce an error.

The hyphen-minus is often used instead of dashes or minus signs in situations where the latter characters are unavailable (such as type-written or ASCII-only text), where they take effort to enter (via dialog boxes or multi-key keyboard shortcuts), or when the writer is unaware of the distinction. Consequently, some writers use two hyphen-minuses  to represent an em dash. In the TeX typesetting languages, a single hyphen-minus (-) renders an hyphen, a single hyphen-minus in math mode ($-$) renders a minus sign, two hyphen-minuses (--) renders an en dash, and three hyphen-minuses (---) renders an em dash.

The hyphen-minus character is also often used when specifying command-line options. The character is usually followed by one or more letters that indicate specific actions. Typically it is called a dash or switch in this context. Various implementations of the getopt function to parse command-line options additionally allow the use of two hyphen-minus characters, to specify long option names that are more descriptive than their single-letter equivalents. Another use of hyphens is that employed by programs written with pipelining in mind: a single hyphen may be recognized in lieu of a filename, with the hyphen then serving as an indicator that a standard stream, instead of a file, is to be worked with.

Soft and hard hyphens 

Although software (hyphenation algorithms) can often automatically make decisions on when to hyphenate a word at a line break, it is also sometimes useful for the user to be able to insert cues for those decisions (which are dynamic in the online medium, given that text can be reflowed). For this purpose, the concept of a soft hyphen (discretionary hyphen, optional hyphen) was introduced, allowing such manual specification of a place where a hyphenated break is allowed but not forced. That is, it does not force a line break in an inconvenient place when the text is later reflowed.

Soft hyphens are inserted into the text at the positions where hyphenation may occur. It can be a tedious task to insert the soft hyphens by hand, and tools using hyphenation algorithms are available that do this automatically. Current modules of the Cascading Style Sheets (CSS) standard provide language-specific hyphenation dictionaries.

Some (OpenType) fonts will change the character at the end of a word. An example is a font that places a long s, 'ſ', everywhere except at the end of a word, where a round s, is used. A soft hyphen can be used to change the previous letter to a round s in the middle of a word. For example, 'prinſeſſen' can be corrected by inserting a soft hyphen between the 'ſ's: 'prinſeſ-ſen' becomes 'prinſesſen' (which is correct in Norwegian).

In contrast, a hyphen that is always displayed and printed is called a "hard hyphen". This can be a Unicode hyphen, a hyphen-minus, or a non-breaking hyphen (see below). Confusingly, the term is sometimes limited to non-breaking hyphens.

Non-breaking hyphens 

The non-breaking hyphen, nonbreaking hyphen, or no-break hyphen looks identical to the regular hyphen, but word processors treat it as a letter so that the hyphenated word will not be divided at the hyphen should this fall at what would be the end of a line of text; instead, either the whole hyphenated word will remain in full at the end of the line or it will go in full to the beginning of the next line. The non-breaking space exists for similar reasons.

The word segmentation rules of most text systems consider a hyphen to be a word boundary and a valid point at which to break a line when flowing text. However, this is not always desirable behavior, especially when it could lead to ambiguity (e.g. retreat and re‑treat would be indistinguishable with a line break after re), or in languages other than English (e.g., a line break at the hyphen in Irish  or Romanian  would be undesirable). The non-breaking hyphen addresses this need.

Usage in date notation 

Use of hyphens to delineate the parts of a written date (rather than the slashes used conventionally in Anglophone countries) is specified in the international standard ISO 8601. Thus, for example, 1789-07-14 is the standard way of writing the date of Bastille Day. This standard has been transposed as European Standard EN 28601 and has been incorporated into various national typographic style guides (e.g., DIN 5008 in Germany). Now all official European Union (and many member state) documents use this style.  This is also the typical date format used in large parts of Europe and Asia, although sometimes with other separators than the hyphen.

This method has gained influence within North America, as most common computer file systems make the use of slashes in file names difficult or impossible. DOS, OS/2 and Windows use  to introduce and separate switches to shell commands, and on both Windows and Unix-like systems slashes in a filename introduce sub-directories which may not be desirable. Besides encouraging use of dashes, the Y-M-D order and zero-padding of numbers less than 10 are also copied from ISO 8601 to make the filenames sort by date order.

Unicode 
Apart from dash and minus sign, Unicode has multiple hyphen characters:
 , a character of multiple uses
  (HTML )
  (HTML  or )
 
  for medieval texts

And in non-Latin scripts:
 
 
 
  (used only as a line-breaking hyphen)
  (used in ancient Near-Eastern linguistics and in blackletter typefaces)
  (has the Unicode property of "Hyphen" despite its name)
  (compatibility character for a small hyphen-minus, used in East Asian typography)
  (compatibility character for a wide hyphen-minus, used in East Asian typography)
  (compatibility character for a wide katakana middle dot, has the Unicode property of "Hyphen" despite its name)

Unicode distinguishes the hyphen from the general interpunct. The characters below do not have the Unicode property of "Hyphen" despite their names:
 
 
  (HTML )
 
 
 
 

(See interpunct and bullet (typography) for more round characters.)

See also 
 Double hyphen
 French orthography#Hyphens
 Hyphen War
 Papyrological hyphen: equivalent in pre-modern Greek
 Enhypen - South Korean boy band whose name derives from the hyphen symbol

Notes

References

External links 

 Wiktionary list of English phrases spelled with a hyphen
 Economist Style Guide—Hyphens
 Using hyphens in English; rules and recommendations
 Jukka Korpela, Soft hyphen (SHY)—a hard problem? (See also his article on word breaking, line breaks, and special characters (including hyphens) in HTML.)
 Markus Kuhn, Unicode interpretation of SOFT HYPHEN breaks ISO 8859-1 compatibility. Unicode Technical Committee document L2/03-155R, June 2003.
 United States Government Printing Office Style Manual 2000 6. Compounding Rules]

Punctuation
Punctuation of English